Left My Blues in San Francisco is the debut studio album by American blues artist Buddy Guy, released in 1967. Future Rotary Connection producer and keyboardist Charles Stepney provided orchestration and drums on some tracks. The album is a mix of older blues tunes and four Buddy Guy originals.

Critical reception
Reviewing a reissue, The Advocate wrote that "the album’s hodgepodge of styles—soul, rhythm and blues, pop and blues—forms a fascinating time capsule from which Guy’s irrepressible personality and fiery guitar do emerge."

Track listing

Personnel
 Buddy Guy - lead guitar, lead vocals
 Gene Barge - tenor saxophone on tracks 1, 2, 7, 9, 10 and 11, production & orchestration
 Lefty Bates - rhythm guitar on track 4
 Milton Bland - tenor saxophone on track 8
 Reggie Boyd - bass guitar on tracks 2, 9, and 11
 Jarrett Gibson - tenor saxophone on track 4
 Lafayette Leake - Hammond organ on track 4
 Abe Locke - tenor saxophone on track 4
 Jack Meyers - bass on track 4
 Matt "Guitar" Murphy - guitar on tracks 2, 8, 9 and 11
 A.C. Reed - tenor saxophone on track 8
 Leroy Stewart - bass guitar on track 8
 Charles Stepney - orchestration, drums on tracks 1, 7, and 10
 Phil Thomas - drums on tracks 2, 4, 9, and 11
 Sonny Turner - trumpet on track 4
 Phil Upchurch - bass guitar on tracks 1, 7, and 10
 Murray Watson - trumpet on track 4

A number of the names of the musicians who contributed to these sessions have been lost to posterity. These are the baritone saxophonist on tracks 1, 7 and 10; bassist on tracks 3, 5 and 6; drummer on tracks 3, 5, 6 and 8; rhythm guitarist on tracks 1, 5, 7 and 10; organist on tracks 3 and 8; pianist on tracks 1, 2, 5, 6, 7, 9, 10 and 11; and tenor saxophonist on tracks 1, 5, 6, 7 and 10
Technical
Ron Malo - recording supervisor, engineer
Max Cooperstein - supervision
Jerry Griffith - album design, cover photography
Bill Utterback - illustration

References

Buddy Guy albums
Chess Records albums
1969 albums
Albums produced by Gene Barge